Intervention, Interventions, The Intervention or An Intervention may refer to:

Entertainment

Film and television
 Intervention (1968 film), a Russian film
 Intervention (2007 film), a British film
 The Intervention, a 2008 film starring Dwier Brown
 The Intervention (film), a 2016 American film
 Intervention (TV series), an American documentary series
 Intervention Canada, a spinoff of the American series
 "Intervention" (Buffy the Vampire Slayer), a 2001 episode
 "Intervention" (How I Met Your Mother), a 2008 episode
 "Intervention" (Stargate Universe), a 2010 episode
 The Intervention, a 2008 Australian TV documentary about the Northern Territory National Emergency Response

Music
 Intervention (album), a 2007 album by Finest Hour
 The Intervention (EP), a 2009 album by The Color Fred
 The Intervention, the film score for the 2016 film of the same name, by Tegan and Sarah
 "Intervention" (song), a 2006 song by Arcade Fire
 "Intervention", a song by Dope from the album Felons and Revolutionaries
 "Intervention", a 2003 song by Madonna from American Life
 "Intervention", a 2012 song by Nine Lashes from the album World We View
 "Intervention", a 2011 song by Silverstein from the album Rescue
 "Intervention", a song by Soulfly from the album Enslaved
 Interventions (Carter), a 2007 composition for solo piano and orchestra by the American composer Elliott Carter
 Interventions, a 2016 album by the Horse Lords

Other entertainment
 "Intervention" (convention), an annual Internet Culture convention held in Rockville, Maryland
 Intervention (musical), 2007 musical by Matt Corriel and Jill Jaysen
 An Intervention, a 2014 play by Mike Bartlett
 Intervention, a 1987 science fiction novel in the Galactic Milieu Series by Julian May
 Intervention, a 2009 medical thriller novel in the Jack Stapleton and Laurie Montgomery series by Robin Cook

International relations and law
Economic interventionism, when a central bank buys or sells foreign currencies in an attempt to adjust their exchange rates
Entente intervention in the Russian Civil War, took place 1918–1925
Federal intervention, a legal concept in Argentina
Humanitarian intervention, an attempt to reduce suffering of a specific state that is facing a domestic armed conflict
Intervention (international law), the use of force by one country or sovereign state in the internal or external affairs of another sovereign state(s)
Intervention (law), a legal procedure for a nonparty to enter an ongoing lawsuit
Northern Territory National Emergency Response, aka "The Intervention", changes to welfare by the Australian government in 2007
Interventionism (politics), a policy of aggressive activity undertaken by a geo-political jurisdiction to alter the internal dynamics of a certain society
Military offensive or invasion of a sovereign state

Social sciences and health
Medical intervention, therapy to treat health problems
Psychological intervention, any action by psychological professionals designed to bring about change in a client
Cognitive interventions, a set of techniques and therapies practiced in counseling
Intervention (counseling), an attempt to compel a subject to "get help" for an addiction or other problem
Intervention theory, used in social studies and social policy to refer to the decision making problems of intervening effectively in a situation in order to secure desired outcomes
Human Systems Intervention, the design and implementation of interventions in social settings where adults are confronted with the need to change their perspectives, attitudes, and actions
Public health intervention, an effort to promote good health behaviour or to prevent bad health behaviour
Intervention (consulting), term used in the field of organizational development
Intervention (journal), a journal published by Medknow Publications

Other
Art intervention, an interaction with a previously existing artwork, audience, or venue
CheyTac Intervention, a bolt-action anti-materiel rifle
 Interventions, a 2007 book by Noam Chomsky
 Interventions, an imprint of Ohio State University Press

See also
Canine Intervention, a 2021 reality TV show
 Interventionism (disambiguation)
Interventions + Lullabies, a 2003 album by The Format
 Interventions: A Life in War and Peace, a 2012 memoir by Kofi Annan